Massachusetts House of Representatives' 37th Middlesex district in the United States is one of 160 legislative districts included in the lower house of the Massachusetts General Court. It covers parts of Middlesex County and Worcester County. Democrat Danillo Sena has represented the district since June 2020. Sena is running for re-election in the 2020 Massachusetts general election.

Locales represented
 part of Acton
 part of Ayer
 Boxborough
 Harvard
 part of Lunenburg
 Shirley

The current district geographic boundary overlaps with those of the Massachusetts Senate's Middlesex and Worcester district and Worcester and Middlesex district.

Representatives
 Carol C. Amick, 1975-1977 
 Michael McGlynn
 Vincent Ciampa
 James B. Eldridge 2003-2009
 Jennifer E. Benson, 2009–2020.
 Danillo Sena, 2020-current

See also
 List of Massachusetts House of Representatives elections
 List of Massachusetts General Courts
 List of former districts of the Massachusetts House of Representatives
 Other Middlesex County districts of the Massachusetts House of Representatives: 1st, 2nd, 3rd, 4th, 5th, 6th, 7th, 8th, 9th, 10th, 11th, 12th, 13th, 14th, 15th, 16th, 17th, 18th, 19th, 20th, 21st, 22nd, 23rd, 24th, 25th, 26th, 27th, 28th, 29th, 30th, 31st, 32nd, 33rd, 34th, 35th, 36th

Images
Portraits of legislators

References

External links
 Ballotpedia
  (State House district information based on U.S. Census Bureau's American Community Survey).
 League of Women Voters—Acton Area
 League of Women Voters of Harvard Massachusetts

House
Government of Middlesex County, Massachusetts
Government in Worcester County, Massachusetts